David Trullo (born 1969 in Madrid) is a Spanish visual artist and Photographer, he was artist in residence in the Irish Museum of Modern Art (2002) and selected in Backlight International Triennial for Photography, Tampere, Finland (2005).

The recurrent themes in his photographic and video work are gender identity and the exploration of the uses of iconography. His work also frequently deals with the interpretation of the traditional subjects of art history. In 2006 the Museo Lazaro Galdiano, Madrid, showed Trullo's "Coined", a photographic series composed of hundred portraits of friends and acquaintances of the artist, all represented in profile, in the manner of Roman emperors, following the style of commemorative medals and coins. The 96 portraits correspond in number to the list of emperors from Augustus to Romulus Augustus.

in 2016 he published together with Pablo Peinado the book : Una historia verdadera, a collection of fotographs about women and men who decided to portray themselves together at some point in their lives.

Exhibitions (Solo Shows) 
 2011 Una Historia Verdadera, Instituto Cervantes Palermo, Italy. 
 Festival Teruel Punto Photo, Teruel, Spain
 2010 Una Historia Verdadera , Fundación FIART, Madrid., Spain
 2009 Monumento, Galería Espacio 48, Santiago de Compostella, Spain
          Rituales, Capilla del Castillo de Santa Catalina, Cádiz., Spain
 2008 Ecce Homo, Q! Galley, Glasgow, UK.
 2007 Ecce Homme, Galería Rita Castellote, Madrid., Spain
 2004 Héroes, Centro Municipal de las Artes, Alcorcón, Madrid.
          Vierzehnheiligen, Galleria Magenta 52, Milán, Italy.
 2003 Ropa Interior, Galería Larra 10, Madrid.
          Vivos y Muertos, Galería Carmen de la Guerra, Madrid.
2001 Memorabilia, C.C. La Canela, Cádiz.
Better Youth, Galería Carmen de la Guerra, Madrid.
 1999 Le Bois Humain, Estampa 99, Madrid.
Pink Spasm, Galería Carmen de la Guerra, Madrid.
 1995 Crédito, Sala El Foro, Pozuelo de Alarcón, Madrid.

Books 
 David Trullo: Heroes, Editor: Alcorcón, Madrid, 2004
 David Trullo, Pablo Peinado: Una verdadera historia, Ed: Coleccion libre, 2016, 
 David Trullo: Familias y más, Ed: Fundación Caixa Galicia, 2008, OCLC: 433955396
 Roberto Gónzalez Fernández, David Trullo, Jesús Grironés: Works 2005-2007 : Sebas, meetings, planetas y satélites ... :

References

External links
 Official site

1969 births
Spanish photographers
Living people